Arci Kempner (born 3 February 1934) is a Brazilian archer. She won a bronze medal in the 1979 Pan American Games.

Career 

Kempner won a bronze medal alongside Claudia Nunez and Daisy Schmidt in the women's recurve event.

She finished 26th in the women's individual event with 2186 points scored.

Kempner tried to compete at the 2007 Pan American Games but was unable to due to having breast cancer.

References

External links 
 Profile on worldarchery.org

1934 births
Living people
Brazilian female archers
Olympic archers of Brazil
Archers at the 1980 Summer Olympics
Sportspeople from Porto Alegre
Pan American Games medalists in archery
Pan American Games bronze medalists for Brazil
Archers at the 1979 Pan American Games
Medalists at the 1979 Pan American Games